Vitali Island is the largest of the 28 offshore islands that constitute the city of Zamboanga in the Republic of the Philippines.

Geography

Barangays
The island is made up of two barangays:
Limaong 
Tumitus

Schools
Limaong Elementary School 
Tumitus Elementary School

Transportation
Vitali Island is accessible by any land transportation. You can reach Brgy. Vitali in 1.5 hours using private vehicle but 2 hours if you use public Bus or Van transportation.

Activities
Scuba Diving
Fishing

See also 
 List of islands of the Philippines

References

Islands of Zamboanga City